Vaus is a surname. Notable people with the surname include:

Alexander Vaus, 15th-century Roman Catholic bishop
George Vaus (died 1508), Scottish Roman Catholic bishop
Steve Vaus (born 1952), American country singer-songwriter
Thomas Vaus, Scottish 15th-century Roman Catholic bishop

See also
Arkanoid Controller, or Vaus, game controller for the Nintendo Entertainment System